Torotoro is the name of:

Torotoro (Bolivia) - a small town in the Potosí Department in Bolivia
Torotoro National Park - a national park in the Potosí Department in Bolivia
Torotoro (Moriori) - Moriori resident in 1791 of Kaingaroa, Chatham Islands, New Zealand
Syma torotoro - the yellow-billed kingfisher

de:Torotoro